Robert Gill  (born 10 February 1982) is an English former professional footballer who played in the Football League as a forward for Doncaster Rovers.

Honours
Individual
Football Conference Goalscorer of the Month: December 2002

References

External links

Doncaster Rovers profile
Ilkeston Town profile

1982 births
Living people
English footballers
Association football forwards
Doncaster Rovers F.C. players
Chester City F.C. players
Dagenham & Redbridge F.C. players
Burton Albion F.C. players
Scarborough F.C. players
Forest Green Rovers F.C. players
Hucknall Town F.C. players
Ilkeston Town F.C. (1945) players
Gedling Town F.C. players
Waikato FC players
Arnold Town F.C. players
Whitburn Junior F.C. players
National League (English football) players
English Football League players